George Lokert of Ayr (c. 1485 – 1547) was a Scottish philosopher and theologian who made significant contributions to the study of logic. A pupil of John Mair, he also studied and taught at the University of Paris, and eventually served as prior of the Sorbonne. Returning to Scotland in 1521, he served as Rector of the University of St Andrews (1522-5).

Returning to Paris, he was closely associated with Noël Béda.

After his second period in Paris, Lokert served as the provost of Crichton, and dean of the University of Glasgow.

References

Further reading
 
 

1485 births
1547 deaths
People from Ayr
Scottish Roman Catholics
Scottish philosophers
Scottish Christian theologians
Scottish logicians
University of Paris alumni
Academic staff of the University of Paris
Rectors of the University of St Andrews
16th-century Scottish people
16th-century philosophers
People associated with the University of Glasgow